Public transport (also known as public transportation, public transit, mass transit, or simply transit) is a system of transport for passengers by group travel systems available for use by the general public unlike private transport, typically managed on a schedule, operated on established routes, and that charge a posted fee for each trip. There is no rigid definition; the Encyclopædia Britannica specifies that public transportation is within urban areas, and air travel is often not thought of when discussing public transport—dictionaries use wording like "buses, trains, etc." Examples of public transport include city buses, trolleybuses, trams (or light rail) and passenger trains, rapid transit (metro/subway/underground, etc.) and ferries. Public transport between cities is dominated by airlines, coaches, and intercity rail. High-speed rail networks are being developed in many parts of the world.

Most public transport systems run along fixed routes with set embarkation/disembarkation points to a prearranged timetable, with the most frequent services running to a headway (e.g.: "every 15 minutes" as opposed to being scheduled for any specific time of the day). However, most public transport trips include other modes of travel, such as passengers walking or catching bus services to access train stations. Share taxis offer on-demand services in many parts of the world, which may compete with fixed public transport lines, or complement them, by bringing passengers to interchanges. Paratransit is sometimes used in areas of low demand and for people who need a door-to-door service.

Urban public transit differs distinctly among Asia, North America, and Europe. In Asia, profit-driven, privately owned and publicly traded mass transit and real estate conglomerates predominantly operate public transit systems. In North America, municipal transit authorities most commonly run mass transit operations. In Europe, both state-owned and private companies predominantly operate mass transit systems.

For geographical, historical and economic reasons, differences exist internationally regarding use and extent of public transport. While countries in the Old World tend to have extensive and frequent systems serving their old and dense cities, many cities of the New World have more sprawl and much less comprehensive public transport. The International Association of Public Transport (UITP) is the international network for public transport authorities and operators, policy decision-makers, scientific institutes and the public transport supply and service industry. It has 3,400 members from 92 countries from all over the globe.

In recent years, some high-wealth cities have seen a decline in public transport usage. A number of sources attribute this trend to the rise in popularity of remote work, ride-sharing services, and car loans being relatively cheap across many countries. Major cities such as Toronto, Paris, Chicago, and London have seen this decline and have attempted to intervene by cutting fares and encouraging new modes of transportation, such as e-scooters and e-bikes. Because of the reduced emissions and other environmental impacts of using public transportation over private transportation, many experts have pointed to an increased investment in public transit as an important climate change mitigation tactic.

History

Conveyances designed for public hire are as old as the first ferries, and the earliest public transport was water transport: on land people walked (sometimes in groups and on pilgrimages, as noted in sources such as the Bible and The Canterbury Tales) or (at least in Eurasia and Africa) rode an animal. Ferries appear in Greek mythology—corpses in ancient Greece were buried with a coin underneath their tongue to pay the ferryman Charon to take them to Hades.

Some historical forms of public transport include the stagecoach, traveling a fixed route between coaching inns, and the horse-drawn boat carrying paying passengers, which was a feature of European canals from their 17th-century origins. The canal itself as a form of infrastructure dates back to antiquity – ancient Egyptians certainly used a canal for freight transportation to bypass the Aswan cataract – and the Chinese also built canals for water transportation as far back as the Warring States period which began in the 5th century BCE. Whether or not those canals were used for-hire public transport remains unknown; the Grand Canal in China (begun in 486 BCE) served primarily for shipping grain.

The omnibus, the first organized public transit system within a city, appears to have originated in Paris, France, in 1662, although the service in question, Carrosses à cinq sols, lasted Only fifteen years, until 1677; omnibuses are next known to have appeared in Nantes, France, in 1826. The omnibus was introduced to London in July 1829.

The first passenger horse-drawn railway opened in 1806: it ran between Swansea and Mumbles in southwest Wales in the United Kingdom.
In 1825 George Stephenson built the Locomotion for the Stockton and Darlington Railway in northeast England, the first public steam railway in the world. The world's first steam-powered underground railway opened in London in 1863. In the following hundred years, the transportation and technical equipment provided by industrial development for the city have been continuously updated, which has accelerated the process of modernization of urban public transportation, and the transportation with backward performance has gradually been eliminated. The stagecoach and railcar were successively replaced by trams, trolleybuses and buses.

The first successful electric streetcar was built for 11 miles of track for the Union Passenger Railway in Tallahassee, Florida in 1888. Electric streetcars could carry heavier passenger loads than predecessors, which reduced fares and stimulated greater transit use.
Two years after the Richmond success, over thirty two thousand electric streetcars were operating in America. Electric streetcars also paved the way for the first subway system in America. Before electric streetcars, steam powered subways were considered. However, most people believed that riders would avoid the smoke filled subway tunnels from the steam engines. In 1894, Boston built the first subway in the United States, an electric streetcar line in a 1.5-mile tunnel under Tremont Street's retail district. Other cities quickly followed, constructing thousands of miles of subway in the following decades.

Since the 1960s, maritime transport has diminished in significance, but traditional ships and hydrofoils remain in use.

In March 2020, Luxembourg abolished fares for trains, trams and buses and became the first country in the world to make all public transport free.

Types
Aerial lift
Aerial tramway
Funifor
Chairlift
Detachable chairlift
Funitel
Gondola lift
Maritime transport
Ferry
Cable ferry
Reaction ferry
Water taxi
Land transport
Personal public transport
Bicycle-sharing system
Scooter-sharing system
Carsharing
Personal rapid transit
Rail transport
Inter-city rail
High-speed rail
Maglev
Urban rail transit
Airport rail link
Atmospheric railway
Automated guideway transit
Cable car
Cable railway
Commuter rail
Elevated railway
Funicular
Inclined elevator
Light rail
Medium-capacity rail system
Monorail
Slope car
Suspension railway
People mover
Railway electrification system
Rapid transit
Rubber-tyred metro
Tram
Heritage streetcar
Tram-train
Road transport
Public transport bus service
Transit bus
Articulated bus
Bi-articulated bus
Trailer bus
Trackless train
Autonomous Rail Rapid Transit
Rigid bus
Airport bus
Bus rapid transit
Double-decker bus
Express bus service
Guided bus
Rubber-tyred trams
High-floor
Low-floor bus
Midibus
Single-deck bus
Tourist trolley
Trolleybus
Intercity bus service
Coach
Minibus
Paratransit
Taxicab
Hackney carriage
Share taxi

Comparing modes

Seven criteria estimate the usability of different types of public transport and its overall appeal. The criteria are speed, comfort, safety, cost, proximity, timeliness and directness. Speed is calculated from total journey time including transfers. Proximity means how far passengers must walk or otherwise travel before they can begin the public transport leg of their journey and how close it leaves them to their desired destination. Timeliness is how long they must wait for the vehicle. Directness records how far a journey using public transport deviates from a passenger's ideal route.

In selecting between competing modes of transport, many individuals are strongly motivated by direct cost (travel fare/ ticket price to them) and convenience, as well as being informed by habit. The same individual may accept the lost time and statistically higher risk of accident in private transport, together with the initial, running and parking costs. Loss of control, spatial constriction, overcrowding, high speeds/accelerations, height and other phobias may discourage use of public transport.

Actual travel time on public transport becomes a lesser consideration when predictable and when travel itself is reasonably comfortable (seats, toilets, services), and can thus be scheduled and used pleasurably, productively or for (overnight) rest. Chauffeured movement is enjoyed by many people when it is relaxing, safe, but not too monotonous. Waiting, interchanging, stops and holdups, for example due to traffic or for security, are discomforting. Jet lag is a human constraint discouraging frequent rapid long-distance east–west commuting, favoring modern telecommunications and VR technologies.

Airline

An airline provides scheduled service with aircraft between airports. Air travel has high speeds, but incurs large waiting times before and after travel, and is therefore often only feasible over longer distances or in areas where a lack of surface infrastructure makes other modes of transport impossible. Bush airlines work more similarly to bus stops; an aircraft waits for passengers and takes off when the aircraft is full.

Bus and coach

Bus services use buses on conventional roads to carry numerous passengers on shorter journeys. Buses operate with low capacity (compared with trams or trains), and can operate on conventional roads, with relatively inexpensive bus stops to serve passengers. Therefore, buses are commonly used in smaller cities, towns, and rural areas, and for shuttle services supplementing other means of transit in large cities.

Bus rapid transit is an ambiguous term used for buses operating on dedicated right-of-way, much like a light rail.

Coach services use coaches (long-distance buses) for suburb-to-CBD or longer-distance transportation. The vehicles are normally equipped with more comfortable seating, a separate luggage compartment, video and possibly also a toilet. They have higher standards than city buses, but a limited stopping pattern.

Electric buses 

Trolleybuses are electrically powered buses that receive power from overhead power line by way of a set of trolley poles for mobility. Online Electric Vehicles are buses that run on a conventional battery, but are recharged frequently at certain points via underground wires.

Certain types of buses, styled after old-style streetcars, are also called trackless trolleys, but are built on the same platforms as a typical diesel, CNG, or hybrid bus; these are more often used for tourist rides than commuting and tend to be privately owned.

Train

Passenger rail transport is the conveyance of passengers by means of wheeled vehicles specially designed to run on railways. Trains allow high capacity at most distance scales, but require track, signalling, infrastructure and stations to be built and maintained resulting in high upfront costs.

Intercity and high-speed rail

Intercity rail is long-haul passenger services that connect multiple urban areas. They have few stops, and aim at high average speeds, typically only making one of a few stops per city. These services may also be international.

High-speed rail is passenger trains operating significantly faster than conventional rail—typically defined as at least . The most predominant systems have been built in Europe and East Asia, and compared with air travel, offer long-distance rail journeys as quick as air services, have lower prices to compete more effectively and use electricity instead of combustion.

Urban rail transit

Urban rail transit is an all-encompassing term for various types of local rail systems, such as these examples trams, light rail, rapid transit, people movers, commuter rail, monorail, suspension railways and funiculars.

Commuter rail

Commuter rail is part of an urban area's public transport; it provides faster services to outer suburbs and neighboring towns and villages. Trains stop at stations that are located to serve a smaller suburban or town center. The stations are often combined with shuttle bus or park and ride systems. Frequency may be up to several times per hour, and commuter rail systems may either be part of the national railway or operated by local transit agencies.

Common forms of commuter rail employ either diesel electric locomotives, or electric multiple unit trains. Some commuter train lines share a railway with freight trains.

Rapid transit

A rapid transit railway system (also called a metro, underground, heavy rail, or subway) operates in an urban area with high capacity and frequency, and grade separation from other traffic. Heavy rail is a high-capacity form of rail transit, with 4 to 10 units forming a train, and can be the most expensive form of transit to build. Modern heavy rail systems are mostly driverless, which allows for higher frequencies and less maintenance cost.

Systems are able to transport large numbers of people quickly over short distances with little land use. Variations of rapid transit include people movers, small-scale light metro and the commuter rail hybrid S-Bahn. Twenty-five cities have systems under construction.

People mover

People movers are a special term for grade-separated rail which uses vehicles that are smaller and shorter in size. These systems are generally used only in a small area such as a theme park or an airport.

Tram

Trams (also known as streetcars) are railborne vehicles that run in city streets or dedicated tracks. They have higher capacity than buses, but must follow dedicated infrastructure with rails and wires either above or below the track, limiting their flexibility.

In the United States, trams were commonly used prior to the 1930s, before being superseded by the bus. In modern public transport systems, they have been reintroduced in the form of the light rail.

Light rail

Light rail is a redevelopment (and use) of the tram, with dedicated right-of-way not shared with other traffic, (often) step-free access and increased speed. Light rail lines are, thus, essentially modernized interurbans. Unlike trams, light rail systems are longer and have one to four cars per train.

Monorail 

Somewhere between light and heavy rail in terms of carbon footprint, monorail systems usually use overhead single tracks, either mounted directly on the track supports or put in an overhead design with the train suspended.

Monorail systems are used throughout the world (especially in Europe and east Asia, particularly Japan), but apart from public transit installations in Las Vegas and Seattle, most North American monorails are either short shuttle services or privately owned services (With 150,000 daily riders, the Disney monorail systems used at their parks may be the most famous in the world).

Personal rapid transit

Personal rapid transit is an automated cab service that runs on rails or a guideway. This is an uncommon mode of transportation (excluding elevators) due to the complexity of automation. A fully implemented system might provide most of the convenience of individual automobiles with the efficiency of public transit. The crucial innovation is that the automated vehicles carry just a few passengers, turn off the guideway to pick up passengers (permitting other PRT vehicles to continue at full speed), and drop them off to the location of their choice (rather than at a stop). Conventional transit simulations show that PRT might attract many auto users in problematic medium-density urban areas. A number of experimental systems are in progress. One might compare personal rapid transit to the more labor-intensive taxi or paratransit modes of transportation, or to the (by now automated) elevators common in many publicly accessible areas.

Cable-propelled transit

Cable-propelled transit (CPT) is a transit technology that moves people in motor-less, engine-less vehicles that are propelled by a steel cable. There are two sub-groups of CPT – gondola lifts and cable cars (railway). Gondola lifts are supported and propelled from above by cables, whereas cable cars are supported and propelled from below by cables.

While historically associated with usage in ski resorts, gondola lifts are now finding increased consumption and utilization in many urban areas – built specifically for the purposes of mass transit. Many, if not all, of these systems are implemented and fully integrated within existing public transportation networks. Examples include Metrocable (Medellín), Metrocable (Caracas), Mi Teleférico in La Paz, Portland Aerial Tram, Roosevelt Island Tramway in New York City, and the London Cable Car.

Ferry

A ferry is a boat used to carry (or ferry) passengers, and sometimes their vehicles, across a body of water. A foot-passenger ferry with many stops is sometimes called a water bus. Ferries form a part of the public transport systems of many waterside cities and islands, allowing direct transit between points at a capital cost much lower than bridges or tunnels, though at a lower speed. Ship connections of much larger distances (such as over long distances in water bodies like the Mediterranean Sea) may also be called ferry services.

Cycleway network

A report published by the UK National Infrastructure Commission in 2018 states that "cycling is mass transit and must be treated as such." Cycling infrastructure is normally provided without charge to users because it is cheaper to operate than mechanised transit systems that use sophisticated equipment and do not use human power.

Electric bikes and scooters
Many cities around the world have introduced electric bikes and scooters to their public transport infrastructure. For example, in the Netherlands many individuals use e-bikes to replace their car commutes. In major American cities, start-up companies such as Uber and Lyft have implemented e-scooters as a way for people to take short trips around the city.

Operation

Infrastructure
All public transport runs on infrastructure, either on roads, rail, airways or seaways. The infrastructure can be shared with other modes, freight and private transport, or it can be dedicated to public transport. The latter is especially valuable in cases where there are capacity problems for private transport. Investments in infrastructure are expensive and make up a substantial part of the total costs in systems that are new or expanding. Once built, the infrastructure will require operating and maintenance costs, adding to the total cost of public transport. Sometimes governments subsidize infrastructure by providing it free of charge, just as is common with roads for automobiles.

Interchanges

Interchanges are locations where passengers can switch from one public transport route to another. This may be between vehicles of the same mode (like a bus interchange), or e.g. between bus and train. It can be between local and intercity transport (such as at a central station or airport).

Timetables

Timetables (or 'schedules' in North American English) are provided by the transport operator to allow users to plan their journeys. They are often supplemented by maps and fare schemes to help travelers coordinate their travel. Online public transport route planners help make planning easier. Mobile apps are available for multiple transit systems that provide timetables and other service information and, in some cases, allow ticket purchase, some allowing to plan your journey, with time fares zones e.g.

Services are often arranged to operate at regular intervals throughout the day or part of the day (known as clock-face scheduling). Often, more frequent services or even extra routes are operated during the morning and evening rush hours. Coordination between services at interchange points is important to reduce the total travel time for passengers. This can be done by coordinating shuttle services with main routes, or by creating a fixed time (for instance twice per hour) when all bus and rail routes meet at a station and exchange passengers. There is often a potential conflict between this objective and optimising the utilisation of vehicles and drivers.

Financing
The main sources of financing are ticket revenue, government subsidies and advertising. The percentage of revenue from passenger charges is known as the farebox recovery ratio. A limited amount of income may come from land development and rental income from stores and vendors, parking fees, and leasing tunnels and rights-of-way to carry fiber optic communication lines.

Fare and ticketing

Most—but not all—public transport requires the purchase of a ticket to generate revenue for the operators. Tickets may be bought either in advance, or at the time of the journey, or the carrier may allow both methods. Passengers may be issued with a paper ticket, a metal or plastic token, or a magnetic or electronic card (smart card, contactless smart card). Sometimes a ticket has to be validated, e.g. a paper ticket has to be stamped, or an electronic ticket has to be checked in.

Tickets may be valid for a single (or return) trip, or valid within a certain area for a period of time (see transit pass). The fare is based on the travel class, either depending on the traveled distance, or based on zone pricing.

The tickets may have to be shown or checked automatically at the station platform or when boarding, or during the ride by a conductor. Operators may choose to control all riders, allowing sale of the ticket at the time of ride. Alternatively, a proof-of-payment system allows riders to enter the vehicles without showing the ticket, but riders may or may not be controlled by a ticket controller; if the rider fails to show proof of payment, the operator may fine the rider at the magnitude of the fare.

Multi-use tickets allow travel more than once. In addition to return tickets, this includes period cards allowing travel within a certain area (for instance month cards), or to travel a specified number of trips or number of days that can be chosen within a longer period of time (called carnet ticket). Passes aimed at tourists, allowing free or discounted entry at many tourist attractions, typically include zero-fare public transport within the city. Period tickets may be for a particular route (in both directions), or for a whole network. A free travel pass allowing free and unlimited travel within a system is sometimes granted to particular social sectors, for example students, elderly, children, employees (job ticket) and the physically or mentally disabled.

Zero-fare public transport services are funded in full by means other than collecting a fare from passengers, normally through heavy subsidy or commercial sponsorship by businesses. Several mid-size European cities and many smaller towns around the world have converted their entire bus networks to zero-fare. The only European capital with free public transport is Tallinn. Local zero-fare shuttles or inner-city loops are far more common than city-wide systems. There are also zero-fare airport circulators and university transportation systems.

Revenue, profit and subsidies
Governments frequently opt to subsidize public transport for social, environmental or economic reasons. Common motivations include the desire to provide transport to people who are unable to use an automobile and to reduce congestion, land use and automobile emissions.

Subsidies may take the form of direct payments for financially unprofitable services, but support may also include indirect subsidies. For example, the government may allow free or reduced-cost use of state-owned infrastructure such as railways and roads, to stimulate public transport's economic competitiveness over private transport, that normally also has free infrastructure (subsidized through such things as gas taxes). Other subsidies include tax advantages (for instance aviation fuel is typically not taxed), bailouts if companies that are likely to collapse (often applied to airlines) and reduction of competition through licensing schemes (often applied to taxis and airlines). Private transport is normally subsidized indirectly through free roads and infrastructure, as well as incentives to build car factories and, on occasion, directly via bailouts of automakers.

Land development schemes may be initialized, where operators are given the rights to use lands near stations, depots, or tracks for property development. For instance, in Hong Kong, MTR Corporation Limited and KCR Corporation generate additional profits from land development to partially cover the cost of the construction of the urban rail system.

Some supporters of mass transit believe that use of taxpayer capital to fund mass transit will ultimately save taxpayer money in other ways, and therefore, state-funded mass transit is a benefit to the taxpayer. Some research has supported this position, but the measurement of benefits and costs is a complex and controversial issue. A lack of mass transit results in more traffic, pollution, and road construction to accommodate more vehicles, all costly to taxpayers; providing mass transit will therefore alleviate these costs. (Perhaps, although others disagree)

A study found that there is a strong link between support for public transport spending is much higher among conservatives who have high levels of trust in government officials than conservatives who do not.

Safety and security
Relative to other forms of transportation, public transit is safe (with a low crash risk) and secure (with low rates of crime). The injury and death rate for public transit is roughly one-tenth that of automobile travel. A 2014 study noted that "residents of transit-oriented communities have about one-fifth the per capita crash casualty rate as in automobile-oriented communities" and that "Transit also tends to have lower overall crime rates than automobile travel, and transit improvements can help reduce overall crime risk by improving surveillance and economic opportunities for at-risk populations."

Although relatively safe and secure, public perceptions that transit systems are dangerous endure. A 2014 study stated that "Various factors contribute to the under-appreciation of transit safety benefits, including the nature of transit travel, dramatic news coverage of transit crashes and crimes, transit agency messages that unintentionally emphasize risks without providing information on its overall safety, and biased traffic safety analysis."

Some systems attract vagrants who use the stations or trains as sleeping shelters, though most operators have practices that discourage this.

Impact

Accessibility

Public transport is means of independent transport for individuals (without walking or bicycling) such as children too young to drive, the elderly without access to cars, those who do not hold a drivers license, and the infirm such as wheelchair users. Kneeling buses, low-floor access boarding on buses and light rail has also enabled greater access for the disabled in mobility. In recent decades low-floor access has been incorporated into modern designs for vehicles. In economically deprived areas, public transport increases individual accessibility to transport where private means are unaffordable.

Environmental

Although there is continuing debate as to the true efficiency of different modes of transportation, mass transit is generally regarded as significantly more energy efficient than other forms of travel. A 2002 study by the Brookings Institution and the American Enterprise Institute found that public transportation in the U.S uses approximately half the fuel required by cars, SUVs and light trucks. In addition, the study noted that "private vehicles emit about 95 percent more carbon monoxide, 92 percent more volatile organic compounds and about twice as much carbon dioxide and nitrogen oxide than public vehicles for every passenger mile traveled".

Studies have shown that there is a strong inverse correlation between urban population density and energy consumption per capita, and that public transport could facilitate increased urban population densities, and thus reduce travel distances and fossil fuel consumption.

Supporters of the green movement usually advocate public transportation, because it offers decreased airborne pollution compared to automobiles. A study conducted in Milan, Italy, in 2004 during and after a transportation strike serves to illustrate the impact that mass transportation has on the environment. Air samples were taken between 2 and 9 January, and then tested for methane, carbon monoxide, non-methane hydrocarbons (NMHCs), and other gases identified as harmful to the environment.  The figure below is a computer simulation showing the results of the study "with 2 January showing the lowest concentrations as a result of decreased activity in the city during the holiday season. 9 January showed the highest NMHC concentrations because of increased vehicular activity in the city due to a public transportation strike."

Based on the benefits of public transport, the green movement has affected public policy. For example, the state of New Jersey released Getting to Work: Reconnecting Jobs with Transit. This initiative attempts to relocate new jobs into areas with higher public transportation accessibility.  The initiative cites the use of public transportation as being a means of reducing traffic congestion, providing an economic boost to the areas of job relocation, and most importantly, contributing to a green environment by reducing carbon dioxide (CO2) emissions.

Using public transportation can result in a reduction of an individual's carbon footprint. Using public transportation saves CO2 emissions in more ways than simply travel as public transportation can help to alleviate traffic congestion as well as promote more efficient land use. When all three of these are considered, it is estimated that 37 million metric tons of CO2 will be saved annually. Another study claims that using public transit instead of private in the U.S. in 2005 would have reduced CO2 emissions by 3.9 million metric tons and that the resulting traffic congestion reduction accounts for an additional 3.0 million metric tons of CO2 saved. This is a total savings of about 6.9 million metric tons per year given the 2005 values.

In order to compare energy impact of public transportation to private transportation, the amount of energy per passenger mile must be calculated. The reason that comparing the energy expenditure per person is necessary is to normalize the data for easy comparison. Here, the units are in per 100 p-km (read as person kilometer or passenger kilometer). In terms of energy consumption, public transportation is better than individual transport in a personal vehicle. In England, bus and rail are popular methods of public transportation, especially in London. Rail provides rapid movement into and out of the city of London while busing helps to provide transport within the city itself. As of 2006–2007, the total energy cost of London's trains was 15 kWh per 100 p-km, about 5 times better than a personal car. For busing in London, it was 32 kWh per 100 p-km, or about 2.5 times that of a personal car. This includes lighting, depots, inefficiencies due to capacity (i.e., the train or bus may not be operating at full capacity at all times), and other inefficiencies.  Efficiencies of transport in Japan in 1999 were 68 kWh per 100 p-km for a personal car, 19 kWh per 100 p-km for a bus, 6 kWh per 100 p-km for rail, 51 kWh per 100 p-km for air, and 57 kWh per 100 p-km for sea. These numbers from either country can be used in energy comparison calculations or life-cycle assessment calculations.

Public transportation also provides an arena to test environmentally friendly fuel alternatives, such as hydrogen-powered vehicles. Swapping out materials to create lighter public transportation vehicles with the same or better performance will increase environmental friendliness of public transportation vehicles while maintaining current standards or improving them. Informing the public about the positive environmental effects of using public transportation in addition to pointing out the potential economic benefit is an important first step towards making a difference.

Land use

Dense areas with mixed-land uses promote daily public transport use while urban sprawl is associated with sporadic public transport use. A recent European multi-city survey found that dense urban environments, reliable and affordable public transport services, and limiting motorized vehicles in high density areas of the cities will help achieve much needed promotion of public transport use.

Urban space is a precious commodity and public transport utilises it more efficiently than a car dominant society, allowing cities to be built more compactly than if they were dependent on automobile transport. If public transport planning is at the core of urban planning, it will also force cities to be built more compactly to create efficient feeds into the stations and stops of transport. This will at the same time allow the creation of centers around the hubs, serving passengers' daily commercial needs and public services. This approach significantly reduces urban sprawl. Public land planning for public transportation can be difficult but it is the State and Regional organizations that are responsible to planning and improving public transportation roads and routes. With public land prices booming, there must be a plan to using the land most efficiently for public transportation in order to create better transportation systems. Inefficient land use and poor planning leads to a decrease in accessibility to jobs, education, and health care.

Societal

The consequences for wider society and civic life, is public transport breaks down social and cultural barriers between people in public life. An important social role played by public transport is to ensure that all members of society are able to travel without walking or cycling, not just those with a driving license and access to an automobile—which include groups such as the young, the old, the poor, those with medical conditions, and people banned from driving. Automobile dependency is a name given by policy makers to places where those without access to a private vehicle do not have access to independent mobility. This dependency contributes to the transport divide. A 2018 study published in the Journal of Environmental Economics and Management concluded that expanded access to public transit has no meaningful impact on automobile volume in the long term.

Above that, public transportation opens to its users the possibility of meeting other people, as no concentration is diverted from interacting with fellow-travelers due to any steering activities. Adding to the above-said, public transport becomes a location of inter-social encounters across all boundaries of social, ethnic and other types of affiliation.

Social issues
Because night trains or coaches can be cheaper than motels, homeless persons sometimes use these as overnight shelters, as with the famous Line 22 ("Hotel 22") in Silicon Valley.

Impact of COVID-19 pandemic
The COVID-19 pandemic had a substantial effect on public transport systems, infrastructures and revenues in various cities across the world.
The pandemic negatively impacted public transport usage by imposing social distancing, remote work, or unemployment in the United States. It caused a 79% drop in public transport riders at the beginning of 2020. This trend continued throughout the year with a 65% reduced ridership as compared to previous years.
Similarly in London, at the beginning of 2020, ridership in the London Underground and buses declined by 95% and 85% respectively.
A 55% drop in public transport ridership as compared to 2019 was reported in Cairo, Egypt after a period of mandatory halt. To reduce COVID-spread through cash contact, in Nairobi, Kenya, cashless payment systems were enforced by National Transport and Safety Authority (NTSA). Public transport was halted for three months in 2020 in Kampala, Uganda with people resorting to walking or cycling. Post-quarantine, upon renovating public transport infrastructure, public transport such as minibus taxis were assigned specific routes. The situation was difficult in cities where people are heavily dependent on the public transport system. In Kigali, Rwanda social distancing requirements led to fifty percent occupancy restrictions, but as the pandemic situation improved, the occupancy limit was increased to meet popular demands. Addis Ababa, Ethiopia also had inadequate bus services relative to demand and longer wait times due to social distancing restrictions and planned to deploy more buses. Both Addis Ababa and Kampala aim to improve walking and cycling infrastructures in the future as means of commuting complementary to buses.

See also

 3D Express Coach
 9-Euro-Ticket
 Finnish models of public transport
 Free public transport
 Hitchhiking
 International Association of Public Transport
 List of urban transit advocacy organisations
 Passenger load factor
 Patronage (transport)
 Private transport
 Public transport bus service
 Public transport route planner
 Public transport timetable
 Sustainable transport
 Transit district
 Transit pass
 Transit police
 Transit watchdog
 Transport divide
 Transportation engineering

References

Further reading
 Bloom, Nicholas Dagen, The Great American Transit Disaster: A Century of Austerity, Auto-centric Planning, and White Flight, University of Chicago Press, 2023 
 Hess, D. 2007. "What is a clean bus? Object conflicts in the greening of urban transit." Sustainability: Science, Practice, & Policy 3(1):45–58.

External links

 International Association of Public Transport
 US High-Speed Rail Association
 Transit Standards - Knowledge base on branding, digital strategy, and graphic standards for public transit, compiled by Stewart Mader. Contains over 100 resources and examples, including 30 graphics standards manuals from transit agencies worldwide.

 
Sustainable transport
Articles containing video clips